István Bartalis (born 7 September 1990) is a Hungarian professional ice hockey Forward who is currently playing for Fehérvár AV19 in the ICE Hockey League (ICEHL).

Playing career
Bartalis played as a youth in Sweden, playing exclusively within the IF Troja/Ljungby organization. After returning to his native Hungary for two seasons with Alba Volán Székesfehérvár of the EBEL, Bartalis opted to move to Germany in signing a one-year deal with top tier DEL club, Schwenninger Wild Wings on 7 July 2016.

Bartalis remained with the Wild Wings for three seasons, leaving out of contract at the conclusion of the 2018–19 season. On 24 June 2019, Bartalis returned to Sweden, agreeing to a one-year contract with HC Vita Hästen of the Allsvenskan.

References

External links

1990 births
Fehérvár AV19 players
Living people
Hungarian ice hockey players
Sportspeople from Miercurea Ciuc
IF Troja/Ljungby players
Romanian ice hockey forwards
Schwenninger Wild Wings players
HC Vita Hästen players